Starfighter is a video game published by Aardvark Technical Services in 1979 for Ohio Scientific computers. Three versions of the game were sold so they could work on a range of OSI hardware: Starfighter 540, Starfighter 600, and Starfighter Alphabetics. It was ported to the TRS-80 and TRS-80 Color Computer.

Plot
Starfighter is a game in which the player commands a starfighter, using photon torpedoes and missiles against enemy starfighters, battleships, cruisers, and supercruisers in the Alpha Centauri system.

Reception
Bruce Campbell reviewed Starfighter in The Space Gamer No. 61. Campbell commented that "While I have enjoyed playing Starfighter, I refuse to recommend a program that so badly needed additional debugging."

References

1979 video games
Space combat simulators
TRS-80 games
TRS-80 Color Computer games
Video games developed in the United States